Sympistis griseicollis is a species of moth in the family Noctuidae (the owlet moths).

The MONA or Hodges number for Sympistis griseicollis is 10148.

References

Further reading

 
 
 

greyi
Articles created by Qbugbot
Moths described in 1882